The Miss Belgium 2010 was held on January 10, 2010, at Casino de Knokke, Belgium. 

The winner, Cilou Annys, Miss West Flanders, entered Miss Universe 2010 and Miss World 2010.

Results

Minor titles 
Miss Wallonia - Alice Piana (Liège)
Miss Brussels - Binta Telemans (Brussels) 
Miss Flanders - Elke Van den Borre (East Flanders)

Special Awards
Miss Congeniality (voted by contestants) - Sophie Pannemans (Liège)

Candidates

Judges
The Miss Belgium 2010 final judges were:

Darline Devos -  President of Committee Miss Belgium
Philippe Delusinne - Administrateur délégué de RTL Belgium
Alizée Poulicek - Miss Belgium 2008
Tom Helsen - Singer

Contestant notes
Gohar Avetisyan, Miss Brussels, is born in Armenia. She has Russian origins on her father's side.
Hélène Czorniak, Miss Luxembourg, has Ukrainian origins on her father's side.
Ewa Merk, first runner-up of Miss Limburg, is born in Poland.
Cassandra Palermo, Miss Hainaut, has German origins on her mother's side and Italian origins on her father's side.
Binta Telemans, first runner-up of Miss Brussels, has Guinean origins on her mother's side.
Pina Vatandas, Miss Namur, has Kosovan origins on her father's side and Turkish origins on her mother's side.

Crossovers 
Contestants who previously competed at other national beauty pageants:

Miss Halle
2006: : Leen Van Belle (Winner)

Miss Dworp 
2008: : Leen Van Belle (Winner)

Miss Jeunesse Dorée
2013: : Maude Lardinois (Winner)

Miss Globe Belgium
2014: : Sarah De Groof (Winner)

Contestants who previously competed or will be competing at international beauty pageants:

Miss Universe
2010: : Cilou Annys (Top 15)

Miss World
2010: : Cilou Annys

Miss International
2010: : Claudia Scheelen

Miss Grand International
2014: : Sarah De Groof

Miss Tourism Queen of the Year International 2010
2010: : Sarah De Groof

Miss Globe International
2014: : Sarah De Groof

References

External links
Official website

2010
2010 in Belgium
2010 beauty pageants
Knokke-Heist